Events in the year 1929 in Brazil.

Incumbents

Federal government 
 President: Washington Luís 
 Vice President: Fernando de Melo Viana

Governors 
 Alagoas: Álvaro Correia Pais
 Amazonas: Ifigênio Ferreira de Sales
 Bahia: Vital Soares
 Ceará: José Carlos de Matos Peixoto
 Goiás:
 till 13 July: Brasil Caiado
 13-14 July: Joaquim Rufino Ramos Jubé
 from 14 July: Alfredo Lopes de Morais
 Maranhão: José Magalhães de Almeida
 Mato Grosso: Mário Correia da Costa
 Minas Gerais: Antônio Carlos Ribeiro de Andrada
 Pará: 
 till 1 February: Dionísio Bentes
 from 1 February: Eurico de Freitas Vale
 Paraíba: João Pessoa Cavalcanti
 Paraná: Afonso Camargo
 Pernambuco: Estácio Coimbra
 Piauí: João de Deus Pires Leal
 Rio Grande do Norte: Juvenal Lamartine de Faria
 Rio Grande do Sul: Getúlio Dornelles Vargas 
 Santa Catarina:
 São Paulo: 
 Sergipe:

Vice governors 
 Rio Grande do Norte:
 São Paulo:

Events 
August - Minas Gerais, Rio Grande do Sul, and Paraíba join the political opposition from several states, including the Democratic Party of São Paulo, to oppose the presidential candidacy of Washington Luís's nominated successor, Júlio Prestes, and form the Liberal Alliance.
20 September - The Liberal Alliance nominates its candidates for the presidential elections: Getúlio Vargas as President and João Pessoa Cavalcanti de Albuquerque as Vice President.
29 October - The US stock market crash causes a fall in coffee quotations to 60%.

Arts and culture

Books
Graça Aranha - A Viagem Maravilhosa

Films
Sangue Mineiro, directed by Humberto Mauro

Births 
3 January - Ernst Mahle, conductor and composer
13 January - Aureliano Chaves, politician (died 2003)
17 April - Odete Lara, actress (died 2015)
4 May - Ronald Golias, comedian (died 2005)
21 October - Walter Hugo Khouri, film director (died 2003)

Deaths 
25 November - Emilie Snethlage, German-born Brazilian naturalist and ornithologist who worked on the bird fauna of the Amazon (born 1868)
26 December - Pedro Weingärtner, painter (born 1853)

References

See also 
1929 in Brazilian football

 
1920s in Brazil
Years of the 20th century in Brazil
Brazil
Brazil